Johannes Becker may refer to:

 Johann Becker (politician) (1869–1951), German politician
 Johannes Heinrich Becker (1898–1961), German-born leader of the Nazi Party of Australia
 Johannes Siegfried Becker, German spy in South America during World War II as part of Operation Bolívar